Ibrahim Abdul Razak or Anglicised: Abdul Razak Ibrahim (born 18 April 1983) is a Ghanaian former professional footballer who played as an attacking midfielder.

Club career
Razak was born in Accra, Ghana. He began playing at the Mighty Jets youth system in 1998. In 2000, he moved to Danish club Aalborg Chang, and in 2001 moved to Italian club Empoli, where he played for one year. The year after he moved to French club Saint-Étienne, where he played for two years on loan before moving back to Empoli.

Razak moved to Maccabi Netanya at the end of 2004 there he spent two successful seasons with 12 goals and 16 assists but after a serious knee injury he went six months without playing and was loaned to Hapoel Ra'anana before he was released by Maccabi Netanya.

After his stint in Israel he got back to Ghana in 2007 to Liberty Professionals and in 2009 he moved to El-Ittihad on a one and a half year deal for $150,000.
In 2010, he went back to Israel signing with Hapoel Acre until the end of the season. In January 2011 he moved to Hapoel Be'er Sheva on a 4.5-year contract.

In the winter of 2011, Razak signed with Vietnamese V-League side Vissai Ninh Bình.

In 2014, he played for FC Imereti Khoni from the Georgian third tier. In July 2015 he signed a one-year contract with Al-Najma from the Bahraini 2nd Division.

International career
Razak also played for the Ghana national team, sent to the 2004 Summer Olympics in Athens.

Honours
Ghana U17
 U17 World Cup: third place 1999

AaB
 Danish Cup: runner-up 1999–2000

Ghana U20
 Youth World Cup: runner-up 2001

Maccabi Netanya
 Toto Cup (Leumit): 2004–05
 Liga Leumit: runner-up 2004–05

References

External links
 

1983 births
Living people
Footballers from Accra
Ghanaian footballers
Association football midfielders
Ghana international footballers
Ghana under-20 international footballers
Ghana youth international footballers
2002 African Cup of Nations players
Serie B players
Ligue 2 players
Israeli Premier League players
Aalborg Chang players
Empoli F.C. players
AS Saint-Étienne players
Maccabi Netanya F.C. players
Hapoel Ra'anana A.F.C. players
Al Ittihad Alexandria Club players
Hapoel Acre F.C. players
Hapoel Be'er Sheva F.C. players
Liberty Professionals F.C. players
Ghanaian expatriate footballers
Ghanaian expatriate sportspeople in Denmark
Expatriate men's footballers in Denmark
Ghanaian expatriate sportspeople in Italy
Expatriate footballers in Italy
Ghanaian expatriate sportspeople in France
Expatriate footballers in France
Ghanaian expatriate sportspeople in Israel
Expatriate footballers in Israel
Ghanaian expatriate sportspeople in Egypt
Expatriate footballers in Egypt
Ghanaian expatriate sportspeople in Bahrain
Expatriate footballers in Bahrain